Vaughn Flannery (October 6, 1898 – December 25, 1955) was an American painter. His work was part of the painting event in the art competition at the 1932 Summer Olympics.

References

1898 births
1955 deaths
20th-century American painters
American male painters
Olympic competitors in art competitions
People from Louisville, Kentucky
20th-century American male artists